Daniel Lysacht  was an Irish Anglican priest in the  17th century.

He was appointed the Archdeacon of Aghadoe and Archdeacon of Ardfert in 1621; and Precentor of Ardfert Cathedral in 1624.

References

{

17th-century Irish Anglican priests
Archdeacons of Ardfert
Archdeacons of Aghadoe